UÇK may refer to:
 Kosovo Liberation Army
 National Liberation Army

See also
UCK (disambiguation)